Salem Township is the name of some places in the U.S. state of Minnesota:
Salem Township, Cass County, Minnesota
Salem Township, Olmsted County, Minnesota

See also

 Salem Township (disambiguation)

Minnesota township disambiguation pages